Elizabeth Langdon Train (born 1955) is a retired United States Navy rear admiral who was the Commander, Office of Naval Intelligence and the Director, National Maritime Intelligence-Integration Office. Train is a third generation naval officer, her father is Admiral Harry D. Train II and her grandfather is Rear Admiral Harold C. Train.

Early life
Train was born in Honolulu, Hawaii and grew up in Virginia and Washington D.C. Her father, Harry D. Train II was a career naval officer who reached the rank of admiral and, prior to retirement, was the Commander-in-Chief, United States Atlantic Fleet, United States Atlantic Command and SACLANT. She is a graduate of the College of William and Mary. After graduating, Train received her commission through Officer Candidate School.

Education
In addition to her undergraduate studies, Train has a Master of Science in National Security Strategy from the National War College, and a Master of Science in Strategic Intelligence from the National Intelligence University.

Career
Following her retirement from military service, Train was named the Chief Operations Officer for Team Rubicon Global, a veteran-led disaster response organization.

Awards and decorations
Train is the recipient of the following:

References

1955 births
Living people
People from Honolulu
College of William & Mary alumni
National War College alumni
National Intelligence University alumni
Recipients of the Legion of Merit
United States Navy admirals
Female admirals of the United States Navy
Recipients of the Defense Superior Service Medal